Anatoly Aleksandrovich Bulgakov (born 14 September 1979) is a former Russian footballer. He was a defender.

Club career
Having played heavily during TP-47's adequate 2004 season, he was dropped to the sidelines in 2005, playing just one game. However, in this fixture, he scored a goal for the first time in the Finnish Premier League.

His efforts during this season, however, were not sufficient to avoid TP-47's drop into the Ykkönen for the start of 2006.

References

1979 births
Living people
Russian footballers
Veikkausliiga players
AC Oulu players
Russian expatriate footballers
Expatriate footballers in Finland
Footballers from Moscow
Association football defenders
TP-47 players